Pachypolia is a genus of moths of the family Noctuidae.

Species
 Pachypolia atricornis Grote, 1874

References
Natural History Museum Lepidoptera genus database
Pachypolia at funet

Cuculliinae